Vernon Valley is an unincorporated community and census-designated place (CDP) located in Vernon Township, in Sussex County, New Jersey, United States. As of the 2010 United States Census, the CDP's population was 1,626.

Geography
According to the United States Census Bureau, the CDP had a total area of 2.705 square miles (7.006 km2), including 2.677 square miles (6.932 km2) of land and 0.028 square miles (0.073 km2) of water (1.04%).

Vernon is a valley bounded by two Crystalline Appalachian ridges known as Pochuck Mountain and Wawayanda Mountain.

Demographics

Census 2010

Census 2000
As of the 2000 United States Census there were 1,737 people, 544 households, and 473 families living in the CDP. The population density was 254.0/km2 (657.2/mi2). There were 560 housing units at an average density of 81.9/km2 (211.9/mi2). The racial makeup of the CDP was 96.78% White, 0.63% African American, 0.06% Native American, 1.04% Asian, 0.40% from other races, and 1.09% from two or more races. Hispanic or Latino of any race were 2.99% of the population.

There were 544 households, out of which 50.4% had children under the age of 18 living with them, 79.8% were married couples living together, 5.1% had a female householder with no husband present, and 12.9% were non-families. 9.9% of all households were made up of individuals, and 2.8% had someone living alone who was 65 years of age or older. The average household size was 3.19 and the average family size was 3.45.

In the CDP the population was spread out, with 31.7% under the age of 18, 6.0% from 18 to 24, 32.0% from 25 to 44, 24.6% from 45 to 64, and 5.8% who were 65 years of age or older. The median age was 36 years. For every 100 females, there were 100.6 males. For every 100 females age 18 and over, there were 96.8 males.

The median income for a household in the CDP was $74,943, and the median income for a family was $75,468. Males had a median income of $56,033 versus $36,219 for females. The per capita income for the CDP was $23,801. About 0.8% of families and 1.9% of the population were below the poverty line, including 1.8% of those under age 18 and 5.1% of those age 65 or over.

References 

Census-designated places in Sussex County, New Jersey
Vernon Township, New Jersey